William Sharpe may refer to:

 William Sharpe (burgess), served in the Virginia House of Burgesses, 1629
 William Sharpe (governor) (fl. 1710), governor of Barbados
 William Sharpe (North Carolina politician) (1742–1818), delegate to the Continental Congress from North Carolina
 William Sharpe (MP) (1834–1909), British politician
 William Henry Sharpe (1868–1942), merchant and political figure in Manitoba, Canada
 William Percy Sharpe (1871–1942), American Democratic politician serving as mayor of Nashville
 William Sharpe (surgeon) (c. 1882-1960), a brain surgeon who developed treatment for retardation and palsy in children
 William Sharpe (Alberta politician) (1887–1964), provincial politician from Alberta, Canada
 William Sharpe (footballer) (fl. 1890), English footballer
 William C. Sharpe, American cultural historian
 William R. Sharpe Jr. (1928–2009), member of the West Virginia Senate
 William F. Sharpe (born 1934), Nobel Prize-winning economist
 William Frederick Nelson Sharpe Canadian aviation pioneer who died during WWI on Feb 4 1915

Others
 Bill Sharpe (athlete) (born 1932), American triple jumper
 Bill Sharpe (WCSC-TV) (born 1951), news anchor for Charleston, South Carolina's CBS station WCSC-TV
 Bill Sharpe (musician) (born 1952), keyboardist of Shakatak
 Bill Sharpe (bassist), American bass guitarist, cooperated with Dave Koz on Memories of a Winter's Night

See also
 William Sharp (disambiguation)